See also:
1964 in comics,
1966 in comics,
1960s in comics and the
list of years in comics

Publications: January - February - March - April - May - June - July - August - September - October - November - December

Events

January
 January 19: In Quino's Mafalda, Felipe makes his debut.
 January 21: in Pilote, La piste des Navajos (Navajos’ trail) by Jean-Michel Charlier and Jean Giraud ; Blueberry gets the surname “Nez Cassè” (Broken nose).
 January 23: The first issue of the British comics magazine Sparky is published. It will run until 1977.
 January: Robert Crumb's Fritz the Cat makes his first public appearance in Help!.
 January: Michael O'Donoghue and Frank Springer's The Adventures of Phoebe Zeit-Geist is first published.

February
 February 13: The final episode of Jay Heavilin and Frank B. Johnson's Einstein is published.
 February 15: Morrie Turner's Wee Pals makes its debut.
 February 21 - March 2: The first edition of the Salone Internazionale dei Comics is held in Bordighera, Italy. The next edition will take place in Lucca and thus grow out to become the  Lucca Comics festival. 
 The first issue of Enemy Ace is published.
In Del Connell and Paul Murry's Phantom Blot story The Phantom Blot meets Super Goof, Goofy’s super-eroic alter ego Super Goof is introduced. In October a magazine is dedicated to him.

March 
 March 14: 
 Raymond Macherot's Sibylline makes its debut in Spirou.
 In Charles M. Schulz' Peanuts the Kite-Eating Tree receives its name. 
 March 28: The final episode of Mike Roy's Akwas is published. 
 March 29: In Quino's Mafalda Manolito makes his debut.
 March 31: Belgian comics artist Marc Sleen finishes his final adventure of The Adventures of Nero in the newspaper Het Volk, after which he joins another newspaper, De Standaard. At this occasion he also terminates all his other series: Piet Fluwijn en Bolleke, Doris Dobbel, Oktaaf Keunink, De Ronde van Frankrijk and De Lustige Kapoentjes, keeping only Nero 
 The first episode of Nino Cannata's Sadik is published.

April 
 April 1: As an April fool's joke, the covers of the rival comic magazines Tintin and Spirou are redesigned to make the Tintin cover look like Spirou and vice versa, complete with restyled logos and lay-out. The joke was thought up by Spirou editor Yvan Delporte in collaboration with Tintin's editors.
 April 4: The Masked Cucumber (Concombre Masqué) makes his debut in Nikita Mandryka's comic Boff in Vaillant. A week later the strange character receives his own long-running spin-off series. 
 April 8: The first story of Jidéhem's Sophie is prepublished in Spirou.
 April 12: Since Marc Sleen is contractually unable to publish a new The Adventures of Nero story for three months Willy Vandersteen and Eduard De Rop create a cut-and-paste comic strip named De Geschiedenis van Sleenovia, which features Nero characters but drawn by Studio Vandersteen. It runs in De Standaard for three months, but after only three episodes the comic strip is modified for copyright issues, as Het Volk sues De Standaard for making an unauthorized copy of their former hit comic strip. After a few weeks the legal battle is solved and the story is allowed to continue as planned. It runs until 30 June, after which Sleen finally makes the first Nero story for De Standaard. 
April 19: Il Tesoro del pirata, by Gian Luigi Bonelli and Guglielmo Letteri; Tex Willer meets the New Orleans sheriff Nat Mac Kennet, who will become a recurring character in his adventures. 
April 29: in Spirou, Des barbelés sur la prairie by Goscinny and Morris 
April 29: in Pilote, Le cavalier perdu, by Jean-Michel Charlier and Jean Giraud; debut of the silver digger Jim McClure, Blueberry’s recurring sidekick. 
 The first issue of the Italian comics magazine Linus is published.

May 
 May 2: The final episode of Right Around Home is published.
 May 3: The first episode of Bud Blake's Tiger is published, which will run until 2003.
 May 10: The comic strip The Born Loser, by Art Sansom, begins syndication.
 In the Italian magazine Linus the series Neutron by Guido Crepax is first published. It will eventually be retitled Valentina.

June
 June 6: In Quino's Mafalda her female friend Susanita makes her debut.
 June 8:  Suske en Wiske receive a statue in Zuiddorpe, The Netherlands.
 June 14: The final episode of Jack Kent's King Aroo is published.
 June 26: The first episode of Ted Cowan and Reg Bunn's The Spider is published. It will run until 1969.

July
 July 12: In Charles M. Schulz' Peanuts Snoopy first tries to write a novel, which becomes a running gag.
 July 22: Alfred Bestall concludes his final Rupert Bear story. The comic is continued by Alex Cubie and Jenny Kisler.
 July 20: in Le journal de Tintin, Piège pour Ric Hochet, by André-Paul Duchâteau and Tibet.
 July 24–25: The first Detroit Triple Fan Fair is held in Detroit, Michigan by Shel Dorf, Jerry Bails, Carl Lundgren, Tom Altschuler, Ed April, Noel Cooper, Gary Crowdus, Howard Devore, Marvin Giles, Dennis Kowicki, Larry Larson, Eugene Seeger and Robert Brosch. Although a convention for various multigenre it features comic books as a major component too, making it the oldest regularly held comic book convention in the world. It will run until 1977.

August
 August 22: In Charles M. Schulz' Peanuts Snoopy first imagines being a member of the French Foreign Legion, which becomes a running gag.
 August 24: in Le journal de Tintin, The necklace affair by Edgar P. Jacobs.

September 
 September 5: The comic strip Eek and Meek, by Howie Schneider, begins syndication.
 September 6: Formiche rosse (Red Ants), by Gian Luigi Bonelli and Guglielmo Letteri ; the Egyptian El Morisco, scholar of occult arts and partner of Tex Willer in many stories of a supernatural nature, makes his debut.
 September 9 : in Pilote, Asterix in Britain, by Goscinny and Uderzo. 
 September 17: Gli adoratori del sole (The sun’s worshippers) by Guido Nolitta and Gallieno Ferri; the clumsy detective Bat Batterton, recurring character in the Zagor’s adventures, make his debut. 
 September 18: The first issue of the British comics magazine Ranger is published. It will run until 18 June 1966. In its first issue Mike Butterworth and Don Lawrence's The Trigan Empire makes its debut. 
 September 20: Bob Weber Sr.'s Moose makes its debut, which will be retitled to Moose Miller in 1971 and eventually Moose & Molly in 1998. The series will continue until 2020.
 September 30: The final episode of Red Ryder is published.
 The final issue of Help! is published.
 Dutch comics artist Marten Toonder moves to Greystones, Ireland.

October
 October 10: In Charles M. Schulz' Peanuts Snoopy first imagines fighting The Red Baron, which becomes a running gag.
 October 14: in Spirou, Bravo les brothers, cross-over between the universes of Spirou & Fantasio and Gaston Lagaffe.
 October 17: In the Disney magazine Topolino, Paperino e le vacanze solitarie, by Rodolfo Cimino and Giovan Battista Carpi is first published. It marks the debut of Anacleto Mitraglia, the equivalent of Neighbor Jones in the Italian Disney comics.
 October 28; in Spirou, Calamity Jane, by Goscinny and Morris.
 In the 98th issue of Mad Al Jaffee's Snappy Answers To Stupid Questions makes its debut.

November
 November 26: The first French satellite A-1 is launched, which is later renamed Astérix, after the eponymous comics character.

December
 December 9: The final episode of Bob van den Born's Professor Pi is published.
 December 19: Jean Tabary's Corinne et Jeannot, a spin-off of Totoche, first appears in print in the magazine Vaillant.
 Dell Comics publishes Lobo, starring the first African-American character to headline his own series. The stories are written by Don "D. J." Arneson and drawn by Tony Tallarico.
 In issue #31 of The Amazing Spider-Man Gwen Stacy makes her debut. The same issue also introduces Marvel's readers' column, Bullpen Bulletins.

Specific date unknown
 The comic strip Art's Gallery, by Art Finley begins syndication.
 The final episode of Philip Mendoza's Gulliver Guinea-Pig is published.
 Robert L. Short publishes the book The Gospel According to Peanuts.

Births

Deaths

January
 January 1: Leo Morey, Peruvian-American illustrator and comics artist, dies at age 65.
 January 21: 
 Carl Buettner, American illustrator and comics artist (Disney comics), passes away at age 61.
 Reino Helismaa, Finnish lyricist, musician and comics writer (Maan mies Marsissa ), dies at age 51.
 Specific date unknown: January: U.S. Abell, American comics artist and illustrator (made Christian comics), dies at age 78.

February
 February 1: Harry Donenfeld, American comics publisher (National Allied Publications), dies at age 71.
 February 7: Ralph Lane, American comics artist (Vic Flynt, assisted on Buz Sawyer, Captain Easy), dies at age 59 or 60.

March
 March 9: Jimmy Murphy, American comics artist (Toots and Casper, It's Poppa Who Pays), passes away at age 73.

April
 April 22: Harvey Eisenberg, American animator and comics artist (Hanna-Barbera comics), dies at age 53.

June
 June 5: Vernon Greene, American comics artist (continued Bringing Up Father), dies at age 64.
 June 11: Fougasse, British cartoonist (Punch), dies at age 77.
 Specific date unknown: Roy Wilson, British comics artist (George the Jolly Gee Gee, Chimpo's Circus worked for Funny Wonder, Film Fun and TV Fun), dies at age 64.

July
 July 14: Marianne Frimberger, Austrian children's book illustrator and comics artist (Die fünf Negerlein), dies at age 88.

August
 August 2: Ving Fuller, American comics artist (Doc Syke), dies at age 62.
 August 15: Julio E. Suárez, Uruguayan radio presenter, painter, caricaturist, teacher, journalist and comics artist (Peloduro, Cocona en el país de las Hormigas), dies at age 59.

September
 September 1: René Giffey, French illustrator and comics artist (Ninette et Cloclo, M. Dupont, Détective, Nigaude et Malicette, Les Frôle-la-Mort, Jean Lion le Spahi, Les Assiégés de Médine, Le Capitaine Fracasse, Les Compagnons de Jéhu, Cinq-Mars, Colomba, La Vénus d'Ille and Carmen, continued L'Espiègle Lili), dies at age 81.
 September 11: Valentí Castanys Borràs, Spanish radio presenter and comics artist (Pepito Holmes, Sergapo, el Lusitano, El vado del valor, Andanzas de Loanillo, Don Bartolo, Gotán, el Mono Sabio), dies at age 67.
 September 12: André Galland, French illustrator, journalist, poster designer and comics artist (Achille Costaud, Ninette et Cloclo,  continued L'Espiègle Lili and Marco, Gars du Voyage), dies at age 79.

October
 October 18: Conrado W. Massaguer, Cuban cartoonist and comics artist, dies at age 76.

November
 November 9: Eduardo Abela, Cuban comics artist, painter and illustrator (El Bobo), dies at age 76.

December
 December 8: Jack Gordon, British comics artist (worked for The Beano), dies at age 74 or 75.

Specific date unknown
 Robert Louis Raemakers, Jr., Dutch illustrator and comics artist (continued Flippie Flink), dies at age 55 or 56 from injuries he suffered during a car accident.
 Maurice Ketten, Italian comics artist (Can You Beat It, Such Is Life, Poor Little Income), dies at age 89 or 90.
 Quincy Scott, American cartoonist and comics artist (Horseback Honeymoon), dies at age 82 or 83.

Publications

January
12 O'Clock High (1965 series) #1 - Dell Comics
80 Page Giant (1964 series) #6 - DC Comics
Action Comics (1938 series) #320 - DC Comics
Adventure Comics (1938 series) #328 - DC Comics
Alvin (1962 series) #10 - Dell Comics
The Amazing Spider-Man (1963 series) #20 - Marvel Comics - The first appearance of the Scorpion by writer Stan Lee and artist Steve Ditko
Archie Giant Series (1954 series) #31 - Archie Publications
Archie's Girls Betty and Veronica (1951 series) #109 - Archie Publications
Archie's Joke Book (1953 series) #84 - Archie Publications
The Atom (1962 series) #16 - DC Comics
The Avengers (1963 series) #12 - Marvel Comics
Baby Huey and Papa (1962 series) #15 - Harvey Comics
Baby Huey in Duckland (1962 series) #8 - Harvey Comics
Battlefield Action (1957 series) #56 - Charlton Comics
The Beverly Hillbillies (1963 series) #8 - Dell Comics
Billy the Kid (1956 series) #48 - Charlton Comics
Blackhawk (1944 series) #204 - DC Comics
Blue Beetle (1964 series) #4 - Charlton Comics
The Brave and the Bold (1955 series) #57 - The first appearance of Metamorpho by writer Bob Haney and artist Ramona Fradon.
Bugs Bunny (1942 series) #97 - Gold Key Comics
Car 54, Where Are You? (1964 series) #4 (second printing) - Dell Comics
Career Girl Romances (1964 series) #27 - Charlton Comics
Casper the Friendly Ghost (1958 series) #77 - Harvey Comics
Casper's Ghostland (1958 series) #74 - Harvey Comics
Challengers of the Unknown (1958 series) #41 - DC Comics
Combat (1961 series) #15  - Dell Comics
Cracked (1958 series) #41 - Major Magazines
Daniel Boone (1965 series) #1 - Gold Key Comics
Dennis the Menace (1953 series) #76 - Hallden-Fawcett
Detective Comics (1937 series) #335 - DC Comics
Devil Kids Starring Hot Stuff (1962 series) #16 - Harvey Comics
Doctor Solar (1962 series) #10 - Gold Key Comics
Donald Duck (1940 series) #99 - Gold Key Comics
Dragstrip Hotrodders (1963 series) #2 - Charlton Comics
Falling in Love (1955 series) #72 - DC Comics
Fantastic Four (1961 series) #34 - Marvel Comics - The first appearance of Gregory Gideon by writer Stan Lee and artist Jack Kirby
Felix the Cat (1962 series) #10  - Dell Comics
Fightin' Air Force (1956 series) #47 - Charlton Comics
Fightin' Army (1956 series) #61 - Charlton Comics
First Kiss (1957 series) #40 - Charlton Comics
The Flintstones (1961 series) #24 - Gold Key Comics
Forbidden Worlds (1951 series) #125 - American Comics Group
The Fox and the Crow (1951 series) #89 - DC Comics
Ghost Stories (1962 series) #9  - Dell Comics
G.I. Combat (1952 series) #109 - DC Comics
Girls' Love Stories (1949 series) #108 - DC Comics
Girls' Romances (1950 series) #106 - DC Comics
Green Lantern (1960 series) #34 - DC Comics
Gunmaster (1964 series) #3 - Charlton Comics
Harvey Hits (1958 series) #88 - Harvey Comics
Heart Throbs (1950 series) #93 - DC Comics
Hot Rods and Racing Cars (1951 series) #72 - Charlton Comics
House of Mystery (1951 series) #148 - DC Comics
Idaho (1963 series) #6  - Dell Comics
The Jetsons (1963 series) #13 - Gold Key Comics
Journey into Mystery (1952 series) #112 - Marvel Comics - Thor battles the Hulk
Jughead (1949 series) #116 - Archie Publications
Jungle War Stories (1962 series) #10  - Dell Comics
Kid Colt Outlaw (1948 series) #120 - Marvel Comics
Kona (1962 series) #13  - Dell Comics
Laugh Comics (1946 series) #166 - Archie Publications
Life with Archie (1958 series) #33 - Archie Publications
Lil' Genius (1954 series) #52 - Charlton Comics
Little Audrey and Melvin (1962 series) #16 - Harvey Comics
Little Dot Dotland (1962 series) #16 - Harvey Comics
Little Lotta (1955 series) #57 - Harvey Comics
Love Diary (1958 series) #36 - Charlton Comics
Mad (1952 series) #92 - EC Comics
Marine War Heroes (1964 series) #6 - Charlton Comics
Marines Attack (1964 series) #3 - Charlton Comics
Mary Poppins (1965 series) #1 - Gold Key Comics
Metal Men (1963 series) #11 - DC Comics
Mighty Mouse (1955 series) #162 - Gold Key Comics
Millie the Model (1946 series) #126 - Marvel Comics
Montana Kid (1957 series) #49 - Charlton Comics
The Munsters (1965 series) #1 - Gold Key Comics
Mutt and Jeff (1939 series) #143 - Harvey Comics
Navy War Heroes (1964 series) #6 - Charlton Comics
Our Army at War (1952 series) #150 - DC Comics
Our Fighting Forces (1954 series) #89 - DC Comics
The Outer Limits (1964 series) #5  - Dell Comics
Pep Comics (1940 series) #177 - Archie Publications
Petticoat Junction (1964 series) #2  - Dell Comics
Peter Potamus (1965 series) #1 - Gold Key Comics
Ponytail (1962 series) #9  - Dell Comics
Porky Pig (1965 series) #1 - Gold Key Comics
Richie Rich (1960 series) #29 - Harvey Comics
Richie Rich Dollars and Cents (1963 series) #7 - Harvey Comics
Romantic Story (1949 series) #75 - Charlton Comics
Sad Sack (1949 series) #161 - Harvey Comics
Sad Sack's Funny Friends (1955 series) #55 - Harvey Comics
Sad Sad Sack World (1964 series) #2 - Harvey Comics
Secret Hearts (1952 series) #101 - DC Comics
Sgt. Fury and his Howling Commandos (1963 series) #14 - Marvel Comics
The Shadow (1964 series) #4 - Archie Publications
Six-Gun Heroes (1950 series) #82 - Charlton Comics
Star Spangled War Stories (1952 series) #118 - DC Comics
Strange Adventures (1950 series) #172 - DC Comics
Strange Suspense Stories (1952 series) #73 - Charlton Comics
Strange Tales (1951 series) #128 - Marvel Comics
Submarine Attack (1958 series) #48 - Charlton Comics
Sugar & Spike (1956 series) #56 - DC Comics
Superboy (1949 series) #118 - DC Comics
Superman (1939 series) #174 - DC Comics
Superman's Girlfriend Lois Lane (1958 series) #54 - DC Comics
Superman's Pal Jimmy Olsen (1954 series) #82 - DC Comics
Sweethearts (1954 series) #80 - Charlton Comics
Tales of Suspense (1959 series) #61 - Marvel Comics
Tales of the Unexpected (1956 series) #86 - DC Comics
Tales to Astonish (1959 series) #63 - Marvel Comics
Teen-Age Love (1958 series) #40 - Charlton Comics
Texas Rangers in Action (1956 series) #48 - Charlton Comics
The Three Stooges (1960 series) #21 - Gold Key Comics
Top Cat (1962 series) #13 - Gold Key Comics
Tuff Ghosts Starring Spooky (1962 series) #14 - Harvey Comics
Turok Son of Stone (1956 series) #43 - Gold Key Comics
Two-Gun Kid (1948 series) #73 - Marvel Comics
Unusual Tales (1955 series) #48 - Charlton Comics
U.S. Air Force Comics (1958 series) #36 - Charlton Comics
Walt Disney's Christmas Parade (1963 series) #3 - Gold Key Comics
Wonder Woman (1942 series) #151 - DC Comics
Wyatt Earp (1956 series) #56 - Charlton Comics
Uncanny X-Men (1963 series) #9 - Marvel Comics - The first appearance of Lucifer by writer Stan Lee and artist Jack Kirby. The first meeting of the Avengers and the X-Men.
Yogi Bear (1959 series) #19 - Gold Key Comics
Young Romance (1947 series) #133 - DC comics

February
80 Page Giant (1964 series) #7 - DC Comics
Action Comics (1938 series) #321 - DC Comics
Adventure Comics (1938 series) #329 - DC Comics
The Adventures of Bob Hope (1950 series) #91 - DC Comics
The Adventures of Jerry Lewis (1957 series) #86 - DC Comics
All-American Men of War (1952 series) #107 - DC Comics
The Amazing Spider-Man (1963 series) #21 - Marvel Comics
Aquaman (1962 series) #19 - DC Comics
The Avengers (1963 series) #13 - Marvel Comics - The first appearance of Count Nefaria and the Maggia by writer Stan Lee and artist Don Heck
Batman (1940 series) #169 - DC Comics
Blackhawk (1944 series) #205 - DC Comics
Captain Storm (1964 series) #5 - DC Comics
Daredevil (1964 series) #6 - Marvel Comics - The first appearance of Mr. Fear by writer Stan Lee and artist Wally Wood
Detective Comics (1937 series) #336 - DC Comics
The Doom Patrol (1964 series) #93 - DC Comics
 Falling in Love (1955 series) #73 - DC Comics
Fantastic Four (1961 series) #35 - Marvel Comics - The first appearance of the Dragon Man by writer Stan Lee and artist Jack Kirby
The Flash (1959 series) #150 - DC Comics
The Fox and the Crow (1951 series) #90 - DC Comics
Girls' Love Stories (1949 series) #109 - DC Comics
House of Secrets (1956 series) #70 - DC Comics
Journey into Mystery (1952 series) #113 - Marvel Comics
Justice League of America (1960 series) #33 - DC Comics
Marvel Collector's Item Classics (1965 series) #1 - Marvel Comics
Modelling with Millie (1963 series) #37 - Marvel Comics
Mystery in Space (1951 series) #97 - DC Comics
Our Army at War (1952 series) #151 - DC Comics
Our Fighting Forces (1954 series) #90 - DC Comics
Patsy and Hedy (1952 series) #98 - Marvel Comics
Patsy Walker (1945 series) #119 - Marvel Comics
Rawhide Kid (1955 series) #44 - Marvel Comics
Rip Hunter Time Master (1961 series) #24 - DC Comics
Sea Devils (1961 series) #21 - DC Comics
Sgt. Fury and his Howling Commandos (1963 series) #15 - Marvel Comics
Showcase (1956 series) #54 - DC Comics
Strange Adventures (1950 series) #173 - DC Comics
Strange Tales (1951 series) #129 - Marvel Comics
Superman (1939 series) #175 - DC Comics
Superman's Girlfriend Lois Lane (1958 series) #55 - DC Comics
Tales of Suspense (1959 series) #62 - Marvel Comics
Tales to Astonish (1959 series) #64 - Marvel Comics
Tomahawk (1950 series) #96 - DC Comics
Wonder Woman (1942 series) #152 - DC Comics
World's Finest Comics (1941 series) #147 - DC Comics
Young Love (1948 series) #47 - DC Comics

March
80 Page Giant (1964 series) #8 - DC Comics
Action Comics (1938 series) #322 - DC Comics
Adventure Comics (1938 series) #330 - DC Comics
The Amazing Spider-Man (1963 series) #22 - Marvel Comics - The first appearance of Princess Python by writer Stan Lee and artist Steve Ditko
The Atom (1962 series) #17 - DC Comics
The Avengers (1963 series) #14 - Marvel Comics
Batman (1940 series) #170 - DC Comics
Blackhawk (1944 series) #206 - DC Comics
The Brave and the Bold (1955 series) #58 - DC Comics
Challengers of the Unknown (1958 series) #42 - DC Comics
Detective Comics (1937 series) #337 - DC Comics
The Doom Patrol (1964 series) #94 - DC Comics
Fantastic Four (1961 series) #36 - Marvel Comics - The first appearance of Madame Medusa and the Frightful Four by writer Stan Lee and artist Jack Kirby
The Flash (1959 series) #151 - DC Comics
G.I. Combat (1952 series) #110 - DC Comics
Girls' Romances (1950 series) #107 - DC Comics
Green Lantern (1960 series) #35 - DC Comics
Hawkman (1964 series) #6 - DC Comics
Heart Throbs (1950 series) #94 - DC Comics
House of Mystery (1951 series) #149 - DC Comics
Journey into Mystery (1952 series) #114 - Marvel Comics - The first appearance of the Absorbing Man by writer Stan Lee and artist Jack Kirby
Justice League of America (1960 series) #34 - DC Comics
Kid Colt Outlaw (1948 series) #121 - Marvel Comics
Metal Men (1963 series) #12 - DC Comics
Millie the Model (1946 series) #127 - Marvel Comics
Mystery in Space (1951 series) #98 - DC Comics
Our Army at War (1952 series) #152 - DC Comics
Secret Hearts (1952 series) #102 - DC Comics
Sgt. Fury and his Howling Commandos (1963 series) #16 - Marvel Comics
Star Spangled War Stories (1952 series) #119 - DC Comics
Strange Adventures (1950 series) #174 - DC Comics
Strange Tales (1951 series) #130 - Marvel Comics - Cameo appearance by the Beatles
Sugar & Spike (1956 series) #57 - DC Comics
Superboy (1949 series) #119 - DC Comics
Superman's Pal Jimmy Olsen (1954 series) #83 - DC Comics
Tales of Suspense (1959 series) #63 - Marvel Comics - The origin of Captain America is retold for the first time in the Silver Age
Tales of the Unexpected (1956 series) #87 - DC Comics
Tales to Astonish (1959 series) #65 - Marvel Comics
Two-Gun Kid (1948 series) #74 - Marvel Comics
World's Finest Comics (1941 series) #148 - DC Comics
Uncanny X-Men (1963 series) #10 - Marvel Comics - The first appearance of Ka-Zar and Zabu by writer Stan Lee and artist Jack Kirby
Young Romance (1947 series) #134 - DC comics

April
80 Page Giant (1964 series) #9 - DC Comics
Action Comics (1938 series) #323 - DC Comics
Adventure Comics (1938 series) #331 - DC Comics
The Adventures of Bob Hope (1950 series) #92 - DC Comics
The Adventures of Jerry Lewis (1957 series) #87 - DC Comics
All-American Men of War (1952 series) #108 - DC Comics
The Amazing Spider-Man (1963 series) #23 - Marvel Comics
Aquaman (1962 series) #20 - DC Comics
The Avengers (1963 series) #15 - Marvel Comics
Blackhawk (1944 series) #207 - DC Comics
Captain Storm (1964 series) #6 - DC Comic
Daredevil (1964 series) #7 - Marvel Comics - First Red Suit
Detective Comics (1937 series) #338 - DC Comics
Falling in Love (1955 series) #74 - DC Comics
Fantastic Four (1961 series) #37 - Marvel Comics
Girls' Love Stories (1949 series) #110 - DC Comics
Girls' Romances (1950 series) #108 - DC Comics
Green Lantern (1960 series) #36 - DC Comics
House of Mystery (1951 series) #150 - DC Comic
House of Secrets (1956 series) #71 - DC Comics
Journey into Mystery (1952 series) #115 - Marvel Comics
Metal Men (1963 series) #13 - DC Comics
Modelling with Millie (1963 series) #38 - Marvel Comics
Our Army at War (1952 series) #153 - DC Comics
Our Fighting Forces (1954 series) #91 - DC Comics
Patsy and Hedy (1952 series) #99 - Marvel Comics
Patsy Walker (1945 series) #120 - Marvel Comics
Rip Hunter Time Master (1961 series) #25 - DC Comics
Rawhide Kid (1955 series) #45 - Marvel Comics
Secret Hearts (1952 series) #103 - DC Comics
Sgt. Fury and his Howling Commandos (1963 series) #17 - Marvel Comics
Showcase (1956 series) #55 - DC Comics
Strange Adventures (1950 series) #175 - DC Comics
Strange Tales (1951 series) #131 - Marvel Comics
Superboy (1949 series) #120 - DC Comics
Superman (1939 series) #176 - DC Comics
Superman's Girlfriend Lois Lane (1958 series) #56 - DC Comics
Superman's Pal Jimmy Olsen (1954 series) #84 - DC Comics
Tales of Suspense (1959 series) #64 - Marvel Comics
Tales to Astonish (1959 series) #66 - Marvel Comics
Tomahawk (1950 series) #97 - DC Comics
Wonder Woman (1942 series) #153 - DC Comics
Young Love (1948 series) #48 - DC Comics

May
80 Page Giant (1964 series) #10 - DC Comics
Action Comics (1938 series) #324 - DC Comics
Adventure Comics (1938 series) #332 - DC Comics - Lightning Lad loses an arm.
The Amazing Spider-Man (1963 series) #24 - Marvel Comics
The Atom (1962 series) #18 - DC Comics
The Avengers (1963 series) #16 - Marvel Comics - A new line-up for the Avengers. The first appearance of Edwin Jarvis by writer Stan Lee and artist Jack Kirby
Batman (1940 series) #171 - DC Comics - The first Silver Age appearance of the Riddler by writer Gardner Fox and artist Sheldon Moldoff
Blackhawk (1944 series) #208 - DC Comics
The Brave and the Bold (1955 series) #59 - DC Comics - The first appearance of the Time Commander by writer Bob Haney and artist Ramona Fradon
Challengers of the Unknown (1958 series) #43 - DC Comics
Detective Comics (1937 series) #339 - DC Comics
The Doom Patrol (1964 series) #95 - DC Comics
Falling in Love (1955 series) #75 - DC Comics
Fantastic Four (1961 series) #38 - Marvel Comics
Fantastic Four Annual (1963 series) #3 - Marvel Comics - The wedding of Sue Storm and Reed Richards by writer Stan Lee and artist Jack Kirby
The Flash (1959 series) #152 - DC Comics
The Fox and the Crow (1951 series) #91 - DC Comics
G.I. Combat (1952 series) #111 - DC Comics
Girls' Love Stories (1949 series) #111 - DC Comics
Hawkman (1964 series) #7 - DC Comics
Heart Throbs (1950 series) #95 - DC Comics
Journey into Mystery (1952 series) #116 - Marvel Comics
Justice League of America (1960 series) #35 - DC Comics
Kid Colt Outlaw (1948 series) #122 - Marvel Comics
Millie the Model (1946 series) #128 - Marvel Comics
Mystery in Space (1951 series) #99 - DC Comics
Our Army at War (1952 series) #154 - DC Comics
Our Fighting Forces (1954 series) #92 - DC Comics
Sgt. Fury and his Howling Commandos (1963 series) #18 - Marvel Comics
Star Spangled War Stories (1952 series) #120 - DC Comics
Strange Adventures (1950 series) #176 - DC Comics
Strange Tales (1951 series) #132 - Marvel Comics
Sugar & Spike (1956 series) #58 - DC Comics
Superman (1939 series) #177 - DC Comics
Superman's Girlfriend Lois Lane (1958 series) #57 - DC Comics
Tales of Suspense (1959 series) #64 - Marvel Comics - The first Silver Age appearance of the Red Skull (revealed to be an imposter; the real one appears in the next issue) by writer Stan Lee and artist Jack Kirby
Tales of the Unexpected (1956 series) #87 - DC Comics
Tales to Astonish (1959 series) #67 - Marvel Comics
Two-Gun Kid (1948 series) #75 - Marvel Comics
Wonder Woman (1942 series) #154 - DC Comics
World's Finest Comics (1941 series) #149 - DC Comics
Uncanny X-Men (1963 series) #11 - Marvel Comics - The first appearance of the Stranger by writer Stan Lee and artist Jack Kirby
Young Romance (1947 series) #133 - DC comics

June
80 Page Giant (1964 series) #11 - DC Comics
Action Comics (1938 series) #325 - DC Comics
Adventure Comics (1938 series) #333 - DC Comics
The Adventures of Bob Hope (1950 series) #93 - DC Comics
The Adventures of Jerry Lewis (1957 series) #88 - DC Comics
All-American Men of War (1952 series) #109 - DC Comics
The Amazing Spider-Man (1963 series) #25 - Marvel Comics - The first appearance of Mary Jane Watson (cameo) and Spencer Smythe by writer Stan Lee and artist Steve Ditko
Aquaman (1962 series) #21 - DC Comics
The Avengers (1963 series) #17 - Marvel Comics
Batman (1940 series) #172 - DC Comics
Blackhawk (1944 series) #209 - DC Comics
Captain Storm (1964 series) #7 - DC Comics
Daredevil (1964 series) #8 - Marvel Comics - The first appearance of the Stilt-Man  by writer Stan Lee and artist Wally Wood
Detective Comics (1937 series) #340 - DC Comics
The Doom Patrol (1964 series) #96 - DC Comics
Fantastic Four (1961 series) #39 - Marvel Comics
The Flash (1959 series) #153 - DC Comics
G.I. Combat (1952 series) #112 - DC Comics
Girls' Romances (1950 series) #109 - DC Comics
Green Lantern (1960 series) #37 - DC Comics
House of Mystery (1951 series) #151 - DC Comic
House of Secrets (1956 series) #72 - DC Comics
Journey into Mystery (1952 series) #117 - Marvel Comics
Justice League of America (1960 series) #36 - DC Comics
Metal Men (1963 series) #14 - DC Comics
Modelling with Millie (1963 series) #39 - Marvel Comics
Mystery in Space (1951 series) #100 - DC Comics
Our Army at War (1952 series) #155 - DC Comics
Patsy and Hedy (1952 series) #100 - Marvel Comics
Patsy Walker (1945 series) #121 - Marvel Comics
Rawhide Kid (1955 series) #46 - Marvel Comics
Rip Hunter Time Master (1961 series) #26 - DC Comics
Sea Devils (1961 series) #23 - DC Comics
Secret Hearts (1952 series) #104 - DC Comics
Sgt. Fury and his Howling Commandos (1963 series) #19 - Marvel Comics
Showcase (1956 series) #56 - DC Comics - The first appearance of the Silver Age Psycho-Pirate by writer Gardner Fox and artist Murphy Anderson
Strange Adventures (1950 series) #177 - DC Comics
Strange Tales (1951 series) #133 - Marvel Comics
Superboy (1949 series) #121 - DC Comics
Superman's Pal Jimmy Olsen (1954 series) #85 - DC Comics
Tales of Suspense (1959 series) #66 - Marvel Comics - The first Silver Age appearance of the Red Skull (actual) by writer Stan Lee and artist Jack Kirby
Tales to Astonish (1959 series) #68 - Marvel Comics
Tomahawk (1950 series) #98 - DC Comics
World's Finest Comics (1941 series) #150 - DC Comics
Young Love (1948 series) #49 - DC Comics

July
80 Page Giant (1964 series) #12 - DC Comics
Action Comics (1938 series) #326 - DC Comics
Adventure Comics (1938 series) #334 - DC Comics
The Amazing Spider-Man (1963 series) #26 - Marvel Comics - The first appearance of the Crime Master by writer Stan Lee and artist Steve Ditko
The Atom (1962 series) #19 - DC Comics
The Avengers (1963 series) #18 - Marvel Comics
Blackhawk (1944 series) #210 - DC Comics
The Brave and the Bold (1955 series)  #60 - First named appearance of the Teen Titans. Robin, Kid Flash, and Aqualad  joined by Wonder Woman's younger sister Wonder Girl in her first appearance.
Challengers of the Unknown (1958 series) #44 - DC Comics
Detective Comics (1937 series) #341 - DC Comics
Falling in Love (1955 series) #76 - DC Comics
Fantastic Four (1961 series) #40 - Marvel Comics
The Fox and the Crow (1951 series) #92 - DC Comics
Girls' Love Stories (1949 series) #112 - DC Comics
Girls' Romances (1950 series) #110 - DC Comics
Green Lantern (1960 series) #38 - DC Comics
Hawkman (1964 series) #8 - DC Comics
Heart Throbs (1950 series) #96 - DC Comics
House of Mystery (1951 series) #152 - DC Comic
Journey into Mystery (1952 series) #118 - Marvel Comics - The first appearance of the Destroyer by writer Stan Lee and artist Jack Kirby
Kid Colt Outlaw (1948 series) #123 - Marvel Comics
Millie the Model (1946 series) #129 - Marvel Comics
Our Army at War (1952 series) #156 - DC Comics
Our Fighting Forces (1954 series) #93 - DC Comics
Secret Hearts (1952 series) #105 - DC Comics
Sgt. Fury and his Howling Commandos (1963 series) #20 - Marvel Comics
Star Spangled War Stories (1952 series) #121 - DC Comics
Strange Adventures (1950 series) #178 - DC Comics
Strange Tales (1951 series) #134 - Marvel Comics
Sugar & Spike (1956 series) #60 - DC Comics
Superboy (1949 series) #122 - DC Comics
Superman (1939 series) #178 - DC Comics
Superman's Girlfriend Lois Lane (1958 series) #58 - DC Comics
Superman's Pal Jimmy Olsen (1954 series) #86 - DC Comics
Tales of Suspense (1959 series) #67 - Marvel Comics
Tales of the Unexpected (1956 series) #89 - DC Comics
Tales to Astonish (1959 series) #69 - Marvel Comics
Two-Gun Kid (1948 series) #76 - Marvel Comics
Wonder Woman (1942 series) #155 - DC Comics
Uncanny X-Men (1963 series) #12 - Marvel Comics - The first appearance of the Juggernaut by writer Stan Lee and artist Jack Kirby
Young Romance (1947 series) #136 - DC comics

August
80 Page Giant (1964 series) #13 - DC Comics
Action Comics (1938 series) #327 - DC Comics
Adventure Comics (1938 series) #335 - DC Comics - The first appearance of Starfinger by writer Edmond Hamilton and artist John Forte
The Adventures of Bob Hope (1950 series) #94 - DC Comics
The Adventures of Jerry Lewis (1957 series) #89 - DC Comics
All-American Men of War (1952 series) #110 - DC Comics
The Amazing Spider-Man (1963 series) #27 - Marvel Comics
Aquaman (1962 series) #22 - DC Comics
The Avengers (1963 series) #19 - Marvel Comics - The first appearance of the Swordsman by writer Stan Lee and artist Don Heck
Batman (1940 series) #173 - DC Comics
Blackhawk (1944 series) #211 - DC Comics
Captain Storm (1964 series) #8 - DC Comic
Daredevil (1964 series) #9 - Marvel Comics
Detective Comics (1937 series) #342 - DC Comics
The Doom Patrol (1964 series) #97 - DC Comics
Falling in Love (1955 series) #77 - DC Comics
Fantastic Four (1961 series) #41 - Marvel Comics
The Flash (1959 series) #154 - DC Comics
Girls' Love Stories (1949 series) #113 - DC Comics
House of Secrets (1956 series) #73 - DC Comics
Journey into Mystery (1952 series) #119 - Marvel Comics - The first appearances of Hogun, Fandral, and Volstagg by writer Stan Lee and artist Jack Kirby
Justice League of America (1960 series) #37 - DC Comics - Part one of annual team-up with the Justice Society.
Metamorpho (1965 series) #1 - DC Comics
Modelling with Millie (1963 series) #40 - Marvel Comics
Mystery in Space (1951 series) #101 - DC Comics
Our Army at War (1952 series) #157 - DC Comics
Our Fighting Forces (1954 series) #94 - DC Comics
Patsy and Hedy (1952 series) #101 - Marvel Comics
Patsy Walker (1945 series) #122 - Marvel Comics
Rawhide Kid (1955 series) #47 - Marvel Comics
Rip Hunter Time Master (1961 series) #27 - DC Comics
Sea Devils (1961 series) #24 - DC Comics
Sgt. Fury and his Howling Commandos (1963 series) #21 - Marvel Comics
Showcase (1956 series) #57 - DC Comics
Strange Adventures (1950 series) #179 - DC Comics
Strange Tales (1951 series) #135 - Marvel Comics - Nick Fury, Agent of SHIELD begins in this issue. The first appearance of SHIELD and HYDRA by writer Stan Lee and artist Jack Kirby
Superman (1939 series) #179 - DC Comics
Superman's Girlfriend Lois Lane (1958 series) #59 - DC Comics
Tales of Suspense (1959 series) #68 - Marvel Comics
Tales to Astonish (1959 series) #70 - Marvel Comics - The Sub-Mariner begins in this issue.
Tomahawk (1950 series) #99 - DC Comics
Wonder Woman (1942 series) #156 - DC Comics
World's Finest Comics (1941 series) #151 - DC Comics
Young Love (1948 series) #50 - DC Comics

September
80 Page Giant (1964 series) #14 - DC Comics
Action Comics (1938 series) #328 - DC Comics
Adventure Comics (1938 series) #336 - DC Comics
The Amazing Spider-Man (1963 series) #28 - Marvel Comics - The first appearance of the Molten Man by writer Stan Lee and artist Steve Ditko
The Amazing Spider-Man Annual (1964 series) #2 - Marvel Comics
The Atom (1962 series) #20 - DC Comics
The Avengers (1963 series) #20 - Marvel Comics
Batman (1940 series) #174 - DC Comics
Blackhawk (1944 series) #212 - DC Comics
The Brave and the Bold (1955 series) #61 - DC Comics
Challengers of the Unknown (1958 series) #45 - DC Comics
Detective Comics (1937 series) #343 - DC Comics
The Doom Patrol (1964 series) #98 - DC Comics
Fantastic Four (1961 series) #42 - Marvel Comics
The Flash (1959 series) #155 - DC Comics
The Fox and the Crow (1951 series) #93 - DC Comics
G.I. Combat (1952 series) #113 - DC Comics
Girls' Romances (1950 series) #111 - DC Comics
Green Lantern (1960 series) #39 - DC Comics
Hawkman (1964 series) #9 - DC Comics
Heart Throbs (1950 series) #97 - DC Comics
 Help!, with vol. 2, #14, canceled by Warren Publishing
House of Mystery (1951 series) #153 - DC Comic
Journey into Mystery (1952 series) #120 - Marvel Comics
Justice League of America (1960 series) #37 - DC Comics - Part two of annual team-up with the Justice Society.
Kid Colt Outlaw (1948 series) #124 - Marvel Comics
Metal Men (1963 series) #15 - DC Comics
Millie the Model (1946 series) #130 - Marvel Comics
Modelling with Millie (1963 series) #41 - Marvel Comics
Mystery in Space (1951 series) #102 - DC Comics - last appearance of Adam Strange in Mystery in Space
Our Army at War (1952 series) #158 - DC Comics
Secret Hearts (1952 series) #106 - DC Comics
Sgt. Fury and his Howling Commandos (1963 series) #22 - Marvel Comics
Star Spangled War Stories (1952 series) #122 - DC Comics
Strange Adventures (1950 series)  #180 - first appearance of Animal Man 
Strange Tales (1951 series) #136 - Marvel Comics
Superboy (1949 series) #123 - DC Comics
Superman's Pal Jimmy Olsen (1954 series) #87 - DC Comics
Tales of Suspense (1959 series) #69 - Marvel Comics
Tales of the Unexpected (1956 series) #90 - DC Comics
Tales to Astonish (1959 series) #71 - Marvel Comics
Two-Gun Kid (1948 series) #77 - Marvel Comics
World's Finest Comics (1941 series) #152 - DC Comics
Uncanny X-Men (1963 series) #13 - Marvel Comics
Young Romance (1947 series) #137 - DC comics

October
 Harvey Thriller line debuts with Unearthly Spectaculars #1, Thrill-O-Rama #1, Blast-Off #1, and Warfront #36 — Harvey Comics
80 Page Giant (1964 series) #15 - DC Comics
Action Comics (1938 series) #329 - DC Comics
Adventure Comics (1938 series) #337 - DC Comics
The Adventures of Bob Hope (1950 series) #95 - DC Comics
The Adventures of Jerry Lewis (1957 series) #90 - DC Comics
All-American Men of War (1952 series) #111 - DC Comics
The Amazing Spider-Man (1963 series) #29 - Marvel Comics
Aquaman (1962 series) #22 - DC Comics - The birth of Aquababy
The Avengers (1963 series) #21 - Marvel Comics - The first appearance of Power Man by writer Stan Lee and artist Don Heck
Batman (1940 series) #175 - DC Comics
Blackhawk (1944 series) #213 - DC Comics
Captain Storm (1964 series) #9- DC Comic
Daredevil (1964 series) #10 - Marvel Comics - The first appearance of the Organizer, Cat-Man, Ape-Man, Frog-Man, and Bird-Man by writer-artist Wally Wood
Detective Comics (1937 series) #344 - DC Comics
Falling in Love (1955 series) #78 - DC Comics
Fantastic Four (1961 series) #43 - Marvel Comics
Girls' Love Stories (1949 series) #114 - DC Comics
Girls' Romances (1950 series) #112 - DC Comics
Green Lantern (1960 series) #40 - DC Comics - The first appearance of Krona by writer John Broome and artist Gil Kane
House of Mystery (1951 series) #154 - DC Comic
House of Secrets (1956 series) #74 - DC Comics
Journey into Mystery (1952 series) #121 - Marvel Comics
Metamorpho (1965 series) #2 - DC Comics
Millie the Model (1946 series) #131 - Marvel Comics
Modelling with Millie (1963 series) #42 - Marvel Comics
Our Army at War (1952 series) #159 - DC Comics
Our Fighting Forces (1954 series) #95 - DC Comics
Patsy and Hedy (1952 series) #102 - Marvel Comics
Patsy Walker (1945 series) #123 - Marvel Comics
Rawhide Kid (1955 series) #48 - Marvel Comics
Rip Hunter Time Master (1961 series) #28 - DC Comics
Sea Devils (1961 series) #25 - DC Comics
Secret Hearts (1952 series) #107 - DC Comics
Sgt. Fury and his Howling Commandos (1963 series) #23 - Marvel Comics
Showcase (1956 series) #58 - DC Comics
Strange Adventures (1950 series) #181 - DC Comics
Strange Tales (1951 series) #137 - Marvel Comics
Superboy (1949 series) #124 - DC Comics
Superman (1939 series) #180 - DC Comics
Superman's Girlfriend Lois Lane (1958 series) #60 - DC Comics
Superman's Pal Jimmy Olsen (1954 series) #88 - DC Comics
Tales of Suspense (1959 series) #70 - Marvel Comics
Tales to Astonish (1959 series) #72 - Marvel Comics
Tomahawk (1950 series) #100 - DC Comics
Wonder Woman (1942 series) #157 - DC Comics - The first appearance of Egg Fu by writer Robert Kanigher and artist Ross Andru
Young Love (1948 series) #51 - DC Comics

November
Action Comics (1938 series) #330 - DC Comics
Adventure Comics (1938 series) #338 - DC Comics
The Amazing Spider-Man (1963 series) #30 - Marvel Comics - The first appearance of the Cat by writer Stan Lee and artist Steve Ditko
The Atom (1962 series) #21 - DC Comics
The Avengers (1963 series) #22 - Marvel Comics
Batman (1940 series) #176 - DC Comics - 80-page Giant
Blackhawk (1944 series) #214 - DC Comics
The Brave and the Bold (1955 series) #62 - DC Comics
Challengers of the Unknown (1958 series) #46 - DC Comics
Detective Comics (1937 series) #345 - DC Comics - The first appearance of Blockbuster by writer Gardner Fox and artist Carmine Infantino
The Doom Patrol (1964 series) #99 - DC Comics - The first appearance of Beast Boy by writer Arnold Drake and artist Bob Brown
Falling in Love (1955 series) #79 - DC Comics
Fantastic Four (1961 series) #44 - Marvel Comics The first appearance of Gorgon by writer Stan Lee and artist Jack Kirby
The Flash (1959 series) #156 - DC Comics
The Fox and the Crow (1951 series) #94 - DC Comics
G.I. Combat (1952 series) #114 - DC Comics
Girls' Love Stories (1949 series) #115 - DC Comics
Hawkman (1964 series) #10 - DC Comics
Heart Throbs (1950 series) #98 - DC Comics
Journey into Mystery (1952 series) #122 - Marvel Comics
Journey into Mystery Annual (1965 series) #1 - Marvel Comics - The first appearance of Hercules by writer Stan Lee and artist Jack Kirby
Justice League of America (1960 series) #39 - DC Comics - 80-page Giant
Justice League of America (1960 series) #40 - DC Comics 
Kid Colt Outlaw (1948 series) #125 - Marvel Comics
Metal Men (1963 series) #16 - DC Comics
Millie the Model (1946 series) #132 - Marvel Comics
Modelling with Millie (1963 series) #43 - Marvel Comics
Mystery in Space (1951 series) #103 - DC Comics - The first appearance of Ultra the Multi-Alien by writer Dave Wood and artist Lee Elias
Our Army at War (1952 series) #160 - DC Comics
Our Fighting Forces (1954 series) #96 - DC Comics
Sgt. Fury and his Howling Commandos (1963 series) #24 - Marvel Comics
Sgt. Fury and his Howling Commandos Annual (1965 series) #1 - Marvel Comics
Star Spangled War Stories (1952 series) #123 - DC Comics
Strange Adventures (1950 series) #182 - DC Comics
Strange Tales (1951 series) #138 - Marvel Comics - The first appearance of Eternity (character) by writer Stan Lee and artist Steve Ditko
Sugar & Spike (1956 series) #61 - DC Comics
Superman (1939 series) #181 - DC Comics - The first appearance of the Superman of 2965 by writer Edmond Hamilton and artist Curt Swan
Superman's Girlfriend Lois Lane (1958 series) #61 - DC Comics
Tales of Suspense (1959 series) #71 - Marvel Comics
Tales of the Unexpected (1956 series) #91 - DC Comics
Tales to Astonish (1959 series) #73 - Marvel Comics
Two-Gun Kid (1948 series) #78 - Marvel Comics
Wonder Woman (1942 series) #158 - DC Comics
World's Finest Comics (1941 series) #153 - DC Comics
Uncanny X-Men (1963 series) #14 - Marvel Comics - The first appearance of the Sentinels by writer Stan Lee and artists Jack Kirby and Werner Roth
Young Romance (1947 series) #137 - DC comics

December
Action Comics (1938 series) #331 - DC Comics
Adventure Comics (1938 series) #339 - DC Comics
The Adventures of Bob Hope (1950 series) #96 - DC Comics
The Adventures of Jerry Lewis (1957 series) #91 - DC Comics
All-American Men of War (1952 series) #112 - DC Comics
The Amazing Spider-Man (1963 series) #31 - Marvel Comics - The first appearances of Gwen Stacy, Harry Osborn, and Miles Warren by writer Stan Lee and artist Steve Ditko
Aquaman (1962 series) #24 - DC Comics
The Avengers (1963 series) #23 - Marvel Comics
Batman (1940 series) #177 - DC Comics
Blackhawk (1944 series) #215 - DC Comics
Captain Storm (1964 series) #10 - DC Comic
Daredevil (1964 series) #11 - Marvel Comics
Detective Comics (1937 series) #346 - DC Comics
The Doom Patrol (1964 series) #100 - DC Comics
Fantastic Four (1961 series) #45 - Marvel Comics - The first appearances of the Inhumans - Black Bolt, Crystal, Karnak, Triton, and Lockjaw by writer Stan Lee and artist Jack Kirby
The Flash (1959 series) #157 - DC Comics
The Fox and the Crow (1951 series) #95 - DC Comics
Girls' Romances (1950 series) #113 - DC Comics
Green Lantern (1960 series) #41 - DC Comics
House of Mystery (1951 series) #155 - DC Comic
House of Secrets (1956 series) #75 - DC Comics
Journey into Mystery (1952 series) #123 - Marvel Comics
Justice League of America (1960 series) #41 - DC Comics
Metamorpho (1965 series) #3 - DC Comics
Millie the Model (1946 series) #133 - Marvel Comics
Modelling with Millie (1963 series) #44 - Marvel Comics
Mystery in Space (1951 series) #104 - DC Comics
Our Army at War (1952 series) #161 - DC Comics
Patsy and Hedy (1952 series) #103 - Marvel Comics
Patsy Walker (1945 series) #124 - Marvel Comics
Rawhide Kid (1955 series) #49 - Marvel Comics
Rip Hunter Time Master (1961 series) #29 - DC Comics - Final issue in the series.
Sea Devils (1961 series) #26 - DC Comics
Secret Hearts (1952 series) #108 - DC Comics
Sgt. Fury and his Howling Commandos (1963 series) #25 - Marvel Comics
Showcase (1956 series) #59 - DC Comics
Strange Adventures (1950 series) #183 - DC Comics
Strange Tales (1951 series) #139 - Marvel Comics
Superboy (1949 series) #125 - DC Comics - The first appearance of Kid Psycho by writer Otto Binder and artist George Papp
Superman (1939 series) #182 - DC Comics
Superman's Pal Jimmy Olsen (1954 series) #89 - DC Comics
Tales of Suspense (1959 series) #72 - Marvel Comics
Tales to Astonish (1959 series) #74 - Marvel Comics
Tomahawk (1950 series) #101 - DC Comics
World's Finest Comics (1941 series) #154 - DC Comics
Uncanny X-Men (1963 series) #15 - Marvel Comics
Young Love (1948 series) #52 - DC Comics

First issues by title

Other publishers
Lenny of Laredo
 Release: by Joel Beck (self-published). Writer/Artist: Joel Beck

Initial appearance by character name

DC Comics
Beast Boy, in Doom Patrol #99 (November)
Donna Troy, in Brave and Bold #60 (July)
Krona, in Green Lantern #40 (October)
Animal Man, in Strange Adventures #180 (September)
Metamorpho, in Brave and the Bold #57 (January)
Blockbuster, in Detective Comics #345 (November)
Immortal Man, in Strange Adventures #177 (June)
Simon Stagg, in Brave and the Bold #57 (January)
Psycho-Pirate, in Showcase #56 (June)
Judomaster, in Special War Series #4 (November)
Fisherman, in Aquaman #21 (June)
Key (comics), in Justice League of America #41 (December)
Golden Boy (DC Comics), in Adventure Comics #331 (April)
Prince Ra-Man, in House of Secrets #73 (July)
Glorith, in Adventure Comics #338 (November)
Evil Star, in Green Lantern #37 (June)
Kid Psycho, in Superboy #125 (December)
Magnetic Kid, in Adventure Comics #335 (August)

Other publishers 
 Fritz the Cat, in Help! (Jan.)

Conventions 
 Salone Internazionale del Comics ("International Congress of Comics") (Bordighera, Italy) — sponsored by Rinaldo Traini and Romano Calisi of the International Congress of Cartoonists and Animators, this is the antecedent to Lucca Comics & Games
 July 24–25: Detroit Triple Fan Fair (Embassy Hotel, Detroit, Michigan) — first annual staging of the ground-breaking multigenre convention
 July 31–August 1: Academy Con I (Broadway Central Hotel, New York City) — sponsored by the Academy of Comic-Book Fans and Collectors and produced by teacher/comics enthusiast Dave Kaler (officially known as "Comi Con: Second Annual Convention of Academy of Comic-Book Fans and Collectors") 200 attendees; official guests include Otto Binder, Bill Finger, Gardner Fox, Mort Weisinger, James Warren, Roy Thomas, and Gil Kane

References